Valery Plotnikov can refer to:

 Valery Plotnikov (boxer) (born 1940), a Russian boxer
 Valery Plotnikov (footballer) (born 1962), a Russian footballer